The Central Committee of Tallinn Trade Unions (TAK) was a political organisation in Estonia.

History
The party was a front for the Communist Party, which had used umbrella organisations to participate in politics since being banned in 1918. In the 1920 parliamentary elections the party won five seats in the Riigikogu. It did not contest the 1923 elections, in which the Communist Party put forward the Workers' United Front instead.

References

Defunct political parties in Estonia
Communist parties in Estonia
Political parties with year of establishment missing
Political parties with year of disestablishment missing